Studied in 1965, the same year that Project Gemini started, the Saturn IB-C was simply designed as an orbital launch vehicle like the original Saturn IB. The booster would consist of an ordinary Saturn IB with four Minuteman first stages used as strap-on boosters. The Saturn IB core booster did fly from 1966 until 1975, but never with its Minuteman strap-on boosters.

References 
 Lowther, Scott, Saturn: Development, Details, Derivatives and Descendants, Work in progress. Available chapters may be ordered directly from Scott Lowther at web site indicated. Accessed at: https://web.archive.org/web/20070521083808/http://www.webcreations.com/ptm.

Saturn (rocket family)